Órbita – Bicicletas Portuguesas, Lda. was an international bicycle manufacturer headquartered in Águeda, Portugal. The bicycles produced were branded as Órbita or Orbita (in some countries).

The company was created on 2 February 1971 and is 95% owned by the Miralago S.A group.

Órbita manufactured a wide range of bicycle types including utility, mountain, racing, touring, hybrid, cruiser and BMX bikes. These included specific models for women, for men, for children, vintage bikes, two rider bikes, tricycles and folding bikes.

70% of Órbita's production was exported and the rest was destined for the Portuguese market. Órbita bikes are presently sold in several countries of Europe, Africa and North America.

Órbita closed in 2020 do to bankruptcy related to financial issues related to the Covid-19 pandemic.

Models presently in production

External links 

USA Official supply website

References

Vehicle manufacturing companies established in 1971
Portuguese brands
Mountain bike manufacturers
Cycle manufacturers of Portugal
Cycle parts manufacturers
Portuguese companies established in 1971